Pierre Unik (5 January 1909 – 27 February 1945) was a French surrealist poet, screenwriter and journalist.

Surrealism 
Unik published his first Surrealist text in the sixth issue of La Révolution surréaliste. He participated in ten of the twelve known surrealist sex investigations, and claimed to have lost his virginity in a brothel, between the ages of fifteen and sixteen.

Disappearance 
Unik was captured in a prisoner of war camp in Silesia in 1940. Escaping in 1945, he never made it back to France, disappearing in Slovakia.

See also
List of people who disappeared

References

1909 births
1940s missing person cases
1945 deaths
20th-century French journalists
20th-century French male writers
20th-century French poets
20th-century French screenwriters
French escapees
French male journalists
French male poets
French male screenwriters
French military personnel killed in World War II
French prisoners of war in World War II
Missing in action of World War II
Writers from Paris